Papilio hornimani, the Hornimans green-banded swallowtail or Horniman's swallowtail, is a species of swallowtail butterfly from the genus Papilio that is found in the highland forests of Kenya and Tanzania.

The larvae feed on Vepris and possibly Citrus species.

Subspecies
Papilio hornimani hornimani (Kenya, Tanzania)
Papilio hornimani mwanihanae Kielland, 1987  (Tanzania)
Papilio hornimani mbulu Kielland, 1990  (Tanzania)

Description
The ground colour is black. The markings are metallic blue. The blue band does not reach the hind wing margin in area 1b.Seitz-Only differs from Papilio charopus in that the median band of the upper surface is only a little widened posteriorly, so that the spots of cellules 2 
and 8 of the hindwing cover but a third or a quarter of the cellules and are scarcely twice as long as broad; the submarginal spots of the hindwing beneath in the male yellow, very prominent, in the female as in charopus. — German East Africa.

Taxonomy
Papilio hornimani belongs to a clade called the nireus species group with 15 members.  The pattern is black with green bands and spots and the butterflies, although called swallowtails lack tails with the exception of Papilio charopus and Papilio hornimani.  The clade members are:

Papilio aristophontes Oberthür, 1897
Papilio nireus Linnaeus, 1758
Papilio charopus Westwood, 1843
Papilio chitondensis de Sousa & Fernandes, 1966
Papilio chrapkowskii Suffert, 1904
Papilio chrapkowskoides Storace, 1952
Papilio desmondi van Someren, 1939
Papilio hornimani Distant, 1879
Papilio interjectana Vane-Wright, 1995
Papilio manlius Fabricius, 1798
Papilio microps Storace, 1951
Papilio sosia Rothschild & Jordan, 1903
Papilio thuraui Karsch, 1900
Papilio ufipa Carcasson, 1961
Papilio wilsoni Rothschild, 1926

Etymology
They are named for Frederick John Horniman.

References

Carcasson, R.H. (1960). "The Swallowtail Butterflies of East Africa (Lepidoptera, Papilionidae)". Journal of the East Africa Natural History Society pdf Key to East Africa members of the species group, diagnostic and other notes and figures. (Permission to host granted by The East Africa Natural History Society)

hornimani
Butterflies described in 1879
Butterflies of Africa
Taxa named by William Lucas Distant